Thenmala is a tourist destination in the eastern side of Kollam district in Kerala, India that is home to the first eco-tourism centre in India. The word 'Thenmala' means "Southern hill" in Malayalam language. The town is 66 km away from Kollam city, 69km from the state capital Trivandrum and is just 14 km away from Tamil Nadu state border. The interstate National Highway-744, connecting Kollam with Madurai in Tamil Nadu, and State Highway-2 of Kerala are passing through Thenmala.

Eco-tourism
Thenmala is the first planned eco-tourism destination in India. The Thenmala Dam is an ecotourism destination in Kerala. The Dam, which impounds the largest reservoir in the state which was built under the Kallada Irrigation and Tree Crop development project. The construction of the Parappara Dam across the confluence of the Chenduruney, Kazhuthurutty and Kulathupuzha rivers has resulted in the creation of an artificial lake of about 26 Sq. Km. which spreads along the middle of the Shendurney Wildlife Sanctuary. It is the largest irrigation project in Kerala.

Etymology
Thenmala is derived from malayalam word "thēn" means nectar/honey and "mala" means mountain. Thenmala was the shooting location for several Malayalam and Tamil movies including Adiverukal.

Tourism
Thenmala attracts foreign and domestic tourists with a host of attractions including boating on the lake, a rope bridge, trekking, mountaineering, biking and a musical fountain. Thenmala is approachable both from Trivandrum and Punalur by road. The nearest railway station is Punalur. Kollam-QLN is better connected nationally. The waterfall called Palaruvi is a prime attraction nearby. Also nearby is a deer rehabilitation center where visitors can see deer in a forest setting and have a peep into a traditional tree house used by forest dwellers to escape harm from wild animals.

Nearby attractions
Kulathupuzha Sastha temple, Anchal Pinnacle view point, Kudukkathu para, Punalur suspension bridge. Thenmala is 72 km from Thiruvananthapuram and 16 km from Palaruvi Falls.

References

 Geography of Kollam district
Villages in Kollam district
Tourist attractions in Kollam district

External links

Thenmala Attractions

The Namal International